Selma Auxiliary Field was a United States Army facility located  east-northeast of Selma, Alabama. Following its closure, it became Selma Municipal Airport.

History 
The airport was built about 1943 as an auxiliary airfield to the Army pilot school at Craig Army Airfield. It was designated Selfield Army Auxiliary Airfield #1, and had three hard-surface runways. The field was said to not have any hangars and was apparently unmanned unless necessary for aircraft recovery.

The field was always closely tied to operations at Craig  and served as an auxiliary field for a number of years during World War II with the initiation of Undergraduate Pilot Training for the Air Force though the 1960s. It became a joint use facility in the early 1950s with Delta Airlines operating DC-3 service and later Southern Airways.

See also

 Alabama World War II Army Airfields

References

External links
 Abandoned Airports: Selma Municipal Airport, Selma, AL

Airfields of the United States Army Air Forces in Alabama
Closed installations of the United States Army
Selma, Alabama
Airports in Dallas County, Alabama